USS Crouter (DE-11) was an  of the United States Navy in commission from 1943 to 1945. The ship was named after Mark Hanna Crouter (1897–1942), U.S. Navy officer and Navy Cross recipient.

Namesake
Mark Hanna Crouter was born on 3 October 1897 in Baker, Oregon. He graduated from the United States Naval Academy on 7 June 1919. After extensive service at sea and ashore, he served as executive officer on the heavy cruiser . He was killed in the Naval Battle of Guadalcanal. He was posthumously awarded the Navy Cross.

Construction and commissioning
Crouter originally was intended for transfer to the United Kingdom as BDE-11, but was instead retained by the U.S. Navy.  She was laid down on 8 February 1942 at the Boston Navy Yard at Boston, Massachusetts and launched on 26 January 1943, sponsored by Mrs. M. H. Crouter, widow of Commander Crouter. She was commissioned on 25 May 1943.

Service history
Departing Boston on 24 July 1943, Crouter deployed to the Pacific Ocean for World War II service. She reached Nouméa, New Caledonia, on 3 September 1943. After several convoy escort voyages to Efate and Espiritu Santo in the New Hebrides and to Viti Levu in the Fiji Islands, she escorted convoys between Nouméa and Port Purvis on Florida Island in the Solomons, aiding in the consolidation of the Solomon Islands until 31 March 1944.

After overhaul on the United States West Coast, Crouter escorted a convoy from Pearl Harbor, Hawaii, to Eniwetok between 14 June 1944 and 3 July 1944. Returning to Pearl Harbor, Crouter conducted submarine training exercises, and rescued nine survivors of a crashed PBY Catalina flying boat on 15 July 1944. She departed Pearl Harbor on 3 August 1944 for continued operations with submarines from Majuro between 13 August and 24 October 1944. Arriving at Eniwetok on 26 October 1944, Crouter operated out of that port as convoy escort to Ulithi Atoll, Kossol Roads, and Saipan until 15 March 1945.

At San Pedro Bay, Leyte, in the Philippine Islands, Crouter joined the screen of the transport convoy bound for Okinawa, arriving on 1 April 1945 for the invasion landings. She remained on patrol off Okinawa, joining a hunter-killer group from 19 April 1945 to 28 April 1945. Her service in anti-aircraft work included shooting down two suicide planes.

Crouter reported to Guam on 21 May 1945 for training with submarines, remaining there through the end of the war and until 18 September 1945.

Crouter returned to the United States at San Pedro, California, on 5 October 1945, and was decommissioned on 30 November 1945. She was sold for scrapping on 25 November 1946.

Awards 
Crouter was awarded one battle star for World War II service in the Pacific.

References 

 
 

Evarts-class destroyer escorts
World War II frigates and destroyer escorts of the United States
Ships built in Boston
1943 ships

ja:トーテュガ (ドック型揚陸艦)